Yohan Bouzin (born 20 August 1974) is a French former professional footballer who played as a left-back.

Honours 
Gueugnon

 Coupe de la Ligue: 1999–2000

Lorient

 Coupe de France: 2001–02
 Coupe de la Ligue runner-up: 2001–02

References 

1974 births
Living people
People from Boulogne-sur-Mer
Sportspeople from Pas-de-Calais
French footballers
Association football fullbacks
Le Touquet AC players
Bourges 18 players
AS Beauvais Oise players
FC Gueugnon players
FC Lorient players
Clermont Foot players
Amiens SC players
Calais RUFC players
Moulins Yzeure Foot players
US Boulogne players
Championnat National 2 players
Championnat National players
Ligue 2 players
Ligue 1 players
Division d'Honneur players
Footballers from Hauts-de-France